Red Creek is a tributary of the Pascagoula River in the U.S. state of Mississippi.  The creek derives its name from naturally occurring tannins that give the water a reddish appearance as it flows over the white sand bottom.  A portion of Red Creek has been designated a State Scenic Stream by the Mississippi Legislature.

Course
Red Creek originates in Lamar County and flows southeastward through Pearl River, Forrest, Stone, George, and Jackson counties. In Jackson County, Red Creek converges with Black Creek before flowing into the Pascagoula River.

That portion of  Red Creek, from Mississippi Highway 26, west of Wiggins, to its convergence with Black Creek, is a public waterway and a designated scenic stream with a 100-ft (30-m) wide, heavily-wooded riparian zone.

Red Creek flows through sections of  De Soto National Forest in the southwest corner of Forrest County, the northeast corner of Pearl River County, the eastern edge of Stone County, and the southwest corner of George County.  Otherwise, the creek is flanked by private property.

Recreation

Red Creek is a developed blueway with four distinct segments for float trips in Stone County:
Red Bluff Segment—The creek meanders , between City Bridge and Cable Bridge.

Natural Springs Segment—The shortest section contains , between Cable Bridge and Mississippi Highway 15.

Numerous white sandbars are suitable as rest stops, picnic areas, or overnight camp areas.

Sixty-one species of freshwater and diadromous fish have been documented in the creek, and at least five species have value for sport fishing.

In  2004, the Red Creek watershed was 66% forested and encompassed .  Within the watershed, licensed hunting is allowed on De Soto National Forest and Red Creek Wildlife Management Area.  Game species such as whitetail deer, squirrel, raccoon, wild turkey, rabbit, and bobwhite quail are found within the watershed.

See also
List of rivers of Mississippi

References

External links
 New Orleans Outdoor Companion: Ramsey Springs access to Red Creek (MS) now open Retrieved 2014-06-03

Rivers of Mississippi
Bodies of water of Stone County, Mississippi
Bodies of water of George County, Mississippi
Bodies of water of Jackson County, Mississippi
Bodies of water of Lamar County, Mississippi